Zargar Bagh (also Romanized as Zargar Bāgh) is a village in Mazkureh Rural District, in the Central District of Sari County, Mazandaran Province, Iran. At the 2006 census, its population was 257, in 64 families.

References 

Populated places in Sari County